Ramaz Chkhikvadze (28 February 1928 – 17 October 2011) was a Georgian film and theater actor. First appearing in the 1954 film The Dragonfly, he starred in over 60 films during his career. He won the award for Best Actor at the 8th Moscow International Film Festival for his role in The Saplings.

Ramaz Chkhikvadze caused a sensation when he appeared on stage as Richard III at the 1979 Edinburgh Festival in a production of Shakespeare's play by the Rustaveli Theatre Company of Tbilisi, Georgia, then still part of the Soviet Union.

Honoring him posthumously, Georgian President Saakashvili issued a statement in which he said "Mr. Ramaz was a distinguished star of Georgian film and theatre and a creator of an entire epoch. The cultural heritage expressed by his unique talent and originality, on which generations have been brought up, will forever stay in the memories of his audience."

Selected filmography 

 The Dragonfly (1954) – Shota
  (1956) – Vano
  (1959) – Zurabi
  (1959) – Agronomist
  (1960) – Taksist
  (1962)
 Londre (1966) – Major of town
 The Plea (1967) – Matsili
  (1969) – Vachnadze
  (1970) – Antoni
 A Necklace for My Beloved' (1971) – Daud
 The Saplings (1972) – Luka
  (1972) – Shardin Alshibaia
  (1973) – merkant Panke
  (1974) – Stalin
 (1975) – Major Gitar
  (1975) – Akram
  (1975) – Daniela
  (1976)
 The Wishing Tree (1976) – Priest Okhrokhine
  (1977)
  (1977)
  (1977) – Pavle
  (1978) – Antoni
  (1979) – Georgy Nikolaevich
  (1979) – Nachalnik kantselyarii
  (1980)
  (1980) – Padre
  (1980)
  (1981)
  (1981)
  (1981)
 Richard III (1982) – Richard III
  (1982) – Jacques
  (1983)
  (1985) – Stalin
 Mournful Unconcern (1987) – Captain Shotover
  (1987)
  (1988)
 Ashik Kerib (1988)
  (1989)
  (1990)
  (1990) – Shoshia
 The Dusk (1990)
  (1991)
  (1991)
  (1992)
  (1992) – Stalin
  (1993)
  (1993)
 A Chef in Love (1996) – Anton Gogoladze
  (2000) – LuarsabIn August of 1944 (2001) – Stalin
 Shoes from America (2001) – Issac
 Chernyy prints (2004) – Gekkeren / Professor
 Artists cuts (2005, by Shota Kalandadze)
 The Rainbowmaker'' (2008) – Grandfather Georgi (final film role)

Awards 
 1972 – People's Artist of Georgia SSR
 1981 – People's Artist of the USSR

References

External links 

Famous Georgian actor dies (Trend News Agency)
 Ramaz Chkhikvadze on Georgian National Filmography

1928 births
2011 deaths
Burials at Didube Pantheon
Actors from Tbilisi
Male film actors from Georgia (country)
People's Artists of Georgia
People's Artists of the USSR
Rustaveli Prize winners
Recipients of the Order of Lenin